The Expanded Program on Immunization (EPI) in the Philippines began in July 1979. And, in 1986, made a response to the Universal Child Immunization goal. The four major strategies include:
 sustaining high routine Full Immunized Child (FIC) coverage of at least 90% in all provinces and cities;
 sustaining the polio-free country for global certification;
 eliminating measles by 2008; and
 eliminating neonatal tetanus by 2008.

Routine Schedule of Immunization
Every Wednesday is designated as immunization day and is adopted in all parts of the country.  Immunization is done monthly in barangay health stations, quarterly in remote areas of the country.

Routine Immunization Schedule for Infants
The standard routine immunization schedule for infants in the Philippines is adopted to provide maximum immunity against the seven vaccine preventable diseases in the country before the child's first birthday. The fully immunized child must have completed BCG 1, DPT 1, DPT 2, DPT 3, OPV 1, OPV 2, OPV 3, HB 1, HB 2, HB 3 and measles vaccines before the child is 12 months of age.

General Principles in Infants/Children Immunization
 Because measles kills, every infant needs to be vaccinated against measles at the age of 9 months or as soon as possible after 9 months as part of the routine infant vaccination schedule.  It is safe to vaccinate a sick child who is suffering from a minor illness (cough, cold, diarrhea, fever or malnutrition) or who has already been vaccinated against measles.
 If the vaccination schedule is interrupted, it is not necessary to restart. Instead, the schedule should be resumed using minimal intervals between doses to catch up as quickly as possible.
  Vaccine combinations (few exceptions), antibiotics, low-dose steroids (less than 20 mg per day), minor infections with low fever (below 38.5º Celsius), diarrhea, malnutrition, kidney or liver disease, heart or lung disease, non-progressive encephalopathy, well controlled epilepsy or advanced age, are not contraindications to vaccination. Contrary to what the majority of doctors may think, vaccines against hepatitis B and tetanus can be applied in any period of the pregnancy.
 There are very few true contraindication and precaution conditions. Only two of these conditions are generally considered to be permanent: severe (anaphylactic) allergic reaction to a vaccine component or following a prior dose of a vaccine, and encephalopathy not due to another identifiable cause occurring within 7 days of pertussis vaccination.
 Only the diluent supplied by the manufacturer should be used to reconstitute a freeze-dried vaccine. A sterile needle and sterile syringe must be used for each vial for adding the diluent to the powder in a single vial or ampoule of freeze-dried vaccine.
 The only way to be completely safe from exposure to blood-borne diseases from injections, particularly hepatitis B virus (HBV), hepatitis C virus (HCV), and human immunodeficiency virus (HIV) is to use one sterile needle, one sterile syringe for each child.

Tetanus Toxoid Immunization Schedule for Women
When given to women of childbearing age, vaccines that contain tetanus toxoid (TT or Td) not only protect women against tetanus, but also prevent neonatal tetanus in their newborn infants.

In June 2000,  the 57 countries that have not yet achieved elimination of neonatal tetanus were ranked and the Philippines was listed together with 22 other countries in Class A, a classification for countries close to maternal and neonatal tetanus elimination.

Care for the Vaccines
To ensure the optimal potency of vaccines,a careful attention is needed in handling practices at the country level. These include storage and transport of vaccines from the primary vaccine store down to the end-user at the health facility, and further down at the outreach sites.  Inappropriate storage, handling and transport of vaccines won't protect patients and may lead to needless vaccine wastage.

A "first expiry and first out" (FEFO) vaccine system is practiced to assure that all vaccines are utilized before its expiry date.  Proper arrangement of vaccines and/or labeling of expiry dates are done to identify those close to expiring.  Vaccine temperature is monitored twice a day (early in the morning and in the afternoon) in all health facilities and plotted to monitor break in the cold chain.  Each level of health facilities has cold chain equipment for use in the storage vaccines which included cold room, freezer, refrigerator, transport box, vaccine carriers, thermometers, cold chain monitors, ice packs, temperature monitoring chart and safety collector boxes.

References

Vaccination
Healthcare in the Philippines